Smilax illinoensis , the Illinois greenbrier, is a North American species of plants found only in the United States and Canada. It is native primarily to the Great Lakes Region with a few populations farther south in Missouri and in the Ohio Valley.

Smilax illinoensis  is an erect, unbranched  herb up to 100 cm (39 inches) tall, with no prickles. It grows in woods and thickets.

References

External links
Climbers, Censusing Lianas In Mesic Biomes of Eastern RegionS  A project of Robyn J. Burnham, University of Michigan
Ontario Wildflowers, Illinois Carrion Flower Smilax illinoensis
Michigan Flora

Smilacaceae
Flora of North America
Plants described in 1968